Spain competed at the 2012 Winter Youth Olympics in Innsbruck, Austria. The Spanish team consisted of 9 athletes competing in 5 sports.

Alpine skiing

Spain qualified 2 athletes.

Boys

Girls

Cross-country skiing

Spain qualified 2 athletes.

Boys

Girls

Sprint

Ice Hockey

Spain qualified 2 athletes.

Boys

Girls

Skeleton

Spain qualified 1 athlete.

Boys

Snowboarding

Spain qualified 2 athletes.

Boys

Girls

See also
Spain at the 2012 Summer Olympics

References

2012 in Spanish sport
Nations at the 2012 Winter Youth Olympics
Spain at the Youth Olympics